Ole Wackström (20 September 1932 – 8 April 2015) was a Finnish racing cyclist. He won the Finnish national road race title in 1957. He also competed at the 1968 and 1972 Summer Olympics. He died in 2015.

References

External links
 

1932 births
2015 deaths
Finnish male cyclists
People from Porvoo
Olympic cyclists of Finland
Cyclists at the 1968 Summer Olympics
Cyclists at the 1972 Summer Olympics
Sportspeople from Uusimaa